French football club SC Bastia's 1998–99 season. Finished 13th place in league. Top scorer of the season, including 14 goals in 12 league matches have been Frédéric Née. Was eliminated to Coupe de France end of 64, the Coupe de la Ligue was able to be among the final 32 teams and the Intertoto Cup was able to be among the semi finals.

Players

In 
Summer
 Franck Matingou and Stéphane Odet from Martigues
 José Clayton from Etoile du Sahel
 David Mazzoncini from Cannes
 Frédéric Née from Caen
 Nebojša Krupniković from Gamba Osaka
 Andrés Grande from Argentinos Juniors
 Mariusz Piekarski from Mogi Mirim
 Patrick Valery from Blackburn Rovers
 Paulo Alves from Sporting Lizbon

Winter
 Sébastien Perez from Blackburn Rovers

Out 
Summer
 Ardian Kozniku and Hervé Sekli to Dinamo Zagreb
 Mamadou Faye to Gazélec Ajaccio
 Cyril Rool to Lens
 Wilfrid Gohel to Cannes
 Fabien Piveteau to retired
 Pascal Garrido to Triestina
 Lubomir Moravcik to Duisburg
 Nenad Jestrovic to Metz
 Sébastien Perez to Blackburn Rovers
 Ousmane Soumah to Lorient

Winter
 Piotr Swierczewski to Gamba Osaka
 Laurent Fournier to retired

Squad

French Division 1

League table

Results summary

Results by round

Matches

Coupe de France

Coupe de la Ligue

UEFA Intertoto Cup

Statistics

Top scorers

League assists

References 

SC Bastia seasons
Bastia